CANT may refer to:

CANT, a solo project from Grizzly Bear bass guitarist and producer, Chris Taylor.
Cantieri Aeronautici e Navali Triestini, an aviation company

See also 
 Cant (disambiguation)